Hypercompe obscura is a moth of the family Erebidae first described by William Schaus in 1901. It is found in Peru.

References

Hypercompe
Moths described in 1901